Scott Barron (born 27 August 1974 in Dublin, Ireland) is a male former tennis player from Ireland.

Barron represented Ireland in the doubles competition at the 1996 Summer Olympics in Atlanta, partnering Owen Casey. The pair was eliminated in the first round there. The right-hander Barron represented Ireland in the Davis Cup from 1993 to 2001, posting an 11–11 record in singles and a 6–2 record in doubles in seventeen ties played. Barron's highest ranking in singles was World No. 263, which he reached on 19 March 2001. His highest doubles ranking was World No. 390, which he reached on 1 December 1997.

Tour singles titles – all levels (2–3)

References
ATP.com profile page
Profile at ITF-site

sports-reference

1974 births
Living people
Irish male tennis players
Olympic tennis players of Ireland
Tennis players from Dublin (city)
Tennis players at the 1996 Summer Olympics